Northwest High School (NWHS) is a public high school in Germantown, Maryland. It is part of the Montgomery County Public Schools public school system. As of 2019, its enrollment was around 2,650 students. It is one of two high schools in Germantown, the other being Seneca Valley High School, with which Northwest shares an athletic rivalry. The school also serves small sections of the cities of Gaithersburg and Darnestown.

The school underwent an expansion project that was completed during the summer of 2006.

Northwest's school mascot is the jaguar and its colors are black, silver and white.

Academics
Northwest High School offers a number of honors and Advanced Placement courses, along with American Sign Language (ASL) French and Spanish languages. The school is competitive academically, with average SAT scores above the national mean.

Northwest hosts the Ulysses Signature Program, a four-year research-based program in which students develop projects focused on one of the Ulysses Project themes: Arts and Humanities; Public Policy and Public Service; and/or Math, Science and Technology. Students are recommended for the rigorous research program as freshmen and remain in the program throughout their senior years.

Principals
 Edward Shirley (1998–2002)
 Sylvia Morrison (2002–2009)
 Eileen "E. Lance" Lancellotti Dempsey (2009–2016)
 James "Jimmy" D'Andrea (2016–2021)
Scott "Scottie" Smith (2021–Present)

Areas served
Students attending Northwest come from parts of Germantown, Boyds, Gaithersburg, and Darnestown, as well as very small portions of Poolesville and Potomac.

Northwest is fed by three area middle schools and eight area elementary schools in the following feeder patterns:

 Kingsview MS (grades 6–8): Great Seneca Creek (K-5), Ronald McNair ES (pre-K-5), Spark M. Matsunaga ES (K-5)
 Lakelands Park MS (grades 6–8) (split articulation with Quince Orchard Cluster): Darnestown ES (K-5), portions of Diamond ES (K-5)
 Roberto Clemente MS (grades 6–8) (split articulation with Seneca Valley Cluster): Clopper Mill ES (pre-K-5), Germantown ES (K-5), Great Seneca Creek (K-5)

Athletics

All teams have varsity and junior varsity teams with the exception of tennis, golf, swim and dive, indoor track and field, poms, and boys'/coed volleyball. JV lacrosse teams were added to Montgomery County athletics in 2008.

Fall sports
Football 
Soccer
Cross country 
Girls' tennis
Golf
Field hockey
Girls' volleyball 
Cheerleading

Winter sports
Basketball
Wrestling
Indoor Track and Field
Hockey
Swim and dive
Cheerleading

Spring sports
Baseball 
Softball
Outdoor Track and field 
Lacrosse
Boys' tennis
Coed volleyball
Boys' volleyball

Multi-season
Poms
Cheerleading

Rivalries
Northwest High School has sports rivalries, particularly in football, with neighboring Seneca Valley High School, and Quince Orchard High School. The annual football game between Northwest and Seneca Valley is known as "The Battle for the King's Trophy" or the "Battle for Germantown". The football rivalry with Quince Orchard is widely considered one of the best in the state, with each school winning three state titles.

State championships
Northwest High School has won a total of 31 state championships in team events, as well 67 individual state championships.

Notable alumni
 Britt Eckerstrom (Class of 2011), Portland Thorns FC Goalkeeper
 Mia Khalifa (Class of 2011), adult entertainment actress, sports analyst
Ashley Nee, Olympic slalom canoeist
Anwar Phillips (Class of 2001), football cornerback, Penn State Nittany Lions, New Orleans Saints, and Baltimore Ravens
 Joe Young (Class of 2007), formerly Joe Lefeged, football safety

References

External links

Northwest statistics from MCPS

Public high schools in Montgomery County, Maryland
Educational institutions established in 1998
1998 establishments in Maryland
Germantown, Maryland